Agafonya may refer to:
Agafonya, a diminutive of the Russian male first name Agafon
Agafonya, a diminutive of the Russian male first name Agafonik